Zhu Shuzhen (1135 – 1180) was a Chinese poet who lived during the Song dynasty. She married an official with whom she had a bad marriage. She either had an affair or committed suicide and after she died, her parents burned poetry that she had written.

Copies of her poetry had already been circulating and 339 shi and 33 ci by her could be reconstituted. Her poems dealt with love's sorrows and her collection is called Heartbreaking Verse. Since she adopted a few lines from Li Qingzhao's work, it's clear that Zhu Shuzhen was familiar with at least some of her work.

References
"Chapter 4 Soong" from Center for Chinese Studies Faculty, Hawaii, last accessed June 4, 2007 (Internet Archive copy)

Song dynasty poets
Chinese women poets
1130s births
1180 deaths
12th-century Chinese women writers
Poets from Zhejiang
12th-century Chinese poets